Bishr ibn al-Ḥasan was a great-grandson of the Islamic prophet Muhammad. He was the son of second Shia Imam Hasan ibn Ali. He is considered to be one of the martyrs of the Battle of Karbala, although no record describes the circumstances surrounding his death by enemy forces.

The first instance of Bishr ibn Hasan to be listed among the martyrs of Karbala was by Shia scholar Ibn Shahrashub. Of Hasan ibn Ali's twenty sons, seven participated in the battle, among them Bishr ibn Hasan. All but one brother was killed during the battle. In his account of their deaths, Shahrashub writes on Bishr: "... and it has been said that Bishr has been martyred, too."

Among Bishr ibn Hasan's brothers who were present at the event of Ashura were Amr (who was killed in the event at Karbala when he was a child), Hasan (better known as 'Hasan al-Muthanna'), Qasim (who was also considered to be one of the martyrs of Karbala), Abd Allah (Abd Allah al-Asghar).

See also

List of casualties in Husayn's army at the Battle of Karbala
Husayn ibn Ali
Battle of Karbala
 Sayyid
 Arba'een Pilgrimage
 Banu Hashim

References 

People killed at the Battle of Karbala
Shia Islam